The Locomobile Company of America was a pioneering American automobile manufacturer founded in 1899, and known for its dedication to precision before the assembly-line era. It was one of the earliest car manufacturers in the advent of the automobile age. For the first two years after its founding, the company was located in Watertown, Massachusetts. Production was transferred to Bridgeport, Connecticut, in 1900, where it remained until the company's demise in 1929. The company manufactured affordable, small steam cars until 1903, when production switched entirely to internal combustion-powered luxury automobiles. Locomobile was taken over in 1922 by Durant Motors and eventually went out of business in 1929. All cars ever produced by the original company were always sold under the brand name Locomobile.

History

The Locomobile Company of America was founded in 1899, the name coined from "locomotive" and "automobile". John B. Walker, editor and publisher of Cosmopolitan, bought the plans for an early steam-powered vehicle produced by Francis and Freelan Stanley for a price they could not resist, US$250,000. At the time, one car had been built, and 199 more had been ordered. Walker promptly sold half of his interest to paving contractor Amzi L. Barber for the same price as he had purchased the entire company. Walker and Barber's partnership lasted two weeks. Walker went on to found Mobile Company of America at the Stanley works in Tarrytown, New York, while Barber moved house to Bridgeport, Connecticut, as Locomobile, where the Stanley twins were named general managers. The Stanley twins founded the Stanley Motor Carriage Company in 1902, becoming the sharpest rival to Locomobile.

Locomobile began by producing steam cars. Initially, they were offered with a single body style only, an inexpensive runabout at $600. Nevertheless, they were a curiosity and middle-class Americans clamoured for the latest technology. Salesmen, doctors, and people needing quick mobility found them useful. More than 4,000 were built between 1899 and 1902.

In 1901, Locomobile offered seven body styles at prices between $600 and $1,400. Most Locomobiles had simple twin-cylinder engines (3x4 in, 76.2x102 mm; 57 in3, 927 cm3) and a wire-wrapped 300-psi boiler, and burned the liquid fuel naphtha to create steam. Typical of the product was the 1904 Runabout, which seated two passengers and sold for $750. The two-cylinder steam engine was situated amidships of the wood-framed car. By now, the car had improved boilers and a new water pump, manufactured by the Overman Wheel Company in Chicopee Falls, Massachusetts. This company itself built the Victor Steamer.

During the Boer War, Locomobile did establish a new mark of sorts, becoming the first automobile to be used in war; it was a generator and searchlight tractor used to dismantle the Klein Nek minefield. It also served as a catering vehicle, with the useful ability (in British eyes, at least) of being able to brew a cup of tea by tapping the boiler.

This was, unfortunately, not a sure way to guarantee commercial success, even in Britain, and Locomobile started experimenting with gasoline internal combustion engines in 1902, starting with a four-cylinder, steel-chassis model designed by Andrew L. Riker. This encouraged the firm to drop steam vehicles the following year, selling the Stanley brothers back their rights for $20,000. In 1903, Barber relinquished his position to his son-in-law Samuel Todd Davis, Jr., who became President of the Locomobile Company.

Switch to internal combustion engines
The 1904 internal combustion Locomobile Touring car had a tonneau and space for five passengers, and sold for $4500, quite a change from the low-priced steam buggies. The front-mounted, vertical, water-cooled straight-four engine produced . A three-speed sliding transmission was used, as on the Système Panhard cars with which it competed. The 1908 Locomobile 40 Runabout was a  two-seater and sold for $4,750. On the strength of recent competition successes, Locomobile soon became known for well-built and speedy luxury cars.

In competition
Like other early marques, Locomobile entered motor racing, contesting the 1905 Gordon Bennett Cup with a  racer; after suffering a transmission gear failure, and with no spare available, driver Joe Tracy only managed two circuits of Auvergne before the transmission packed up entirely. Tracy did better for the company at the Vanderbilt Cup, placing third. A ,  F-head was damaged by tire trouble, so Tracy failed again in the 1906 Vanderbilt, but in 1908, George Robertson (wearing number 16) took the win in this car, ahead of fellow Locomobile pilot Joe Florida in third, becoming the first United States-built car to win in international competition. This was the high-water mark for Locomobile racing, and they soon faded from the scene, though Orin Davis did score a win in the Los Angeles–Phoenix rally in 1913. A Locomobile was raced by Eva Mudge, believed to be the first female driving licence holder and first female racing driver. In 1925, the Locomobile team entered a front-wheel-drive Miller car called the "Junior Eight Special" after their recently introduced smaller car at the Indianapolis 500, but there was nothing Locomobile about it aside from the name.

Model 48 and the Durant years

The most important model for the marque became the impressive Model 48. Introduced in 1911 as the "type M," it had a very conservative, perhaps dated, concept. Its engine was a straight six with side valves; cylinders were still cast in pairs and it featured a nonremovable cylinder head. While called the "M" internally, this car is usually referred to by its tax hp rating. The brake horsepower rating was somewhere north of 90 for the original model, higher in the later versions. Quality of materials and workmanship were impeccable and among the best in the world. Such was also its pricing: A typical open-body cost about $10,000 when the average Model T Ford Phaeton cost about $300. Locomobile also offered custom designs for the lamps and metal work, carried out by Tiffany Studios. Until 1915, left- or right-hand drive could be specified; afterwards, left-hand drive became standard. Right-hand drive cars were meant for export and sat on a chassis four inches shorter. Around 1919, the engine was updated with a longer  stroke, for  displacement while retaining the same tax hp rating.

A smaller "38 hp" model, very similar to the Model 48, was added in 1913. By 1914, Locomobile had stopped selling all four-cylinder models to concentrate exclusively on sixes.

In July 1922, Locomobile was acquired by Durant Motors, which not only continued using the Locomobile brand name for their top-of-the-line autos until 1929, but also still produced the Model 48 until its demise in 1929. Until the mid-1920s, this car was Locomobile's only offering. In 1925, the marque brought out their first new model, the 8-66 Junior Eight, with a more contemporary straight-eight engine, and more importantly, a lower price of $1,785.

Introduction of the even smaller Junior Six was in 1926, but this car stayed only for one model year. The larger Model 90 that appeared in the same year was produced until 1929.

With the 8-70 of 1927, Locomobile added one more eight-cylinder car. Using an off the shelf Lycoming engine, this was not accepted as a true Locomobile in the marketplace and served to damage the company's reputation. In the following year, the Junior Eight 8-66 was phased out.

For 1929, a new 8-86 and 8-88 came out, but it was too late to save the company. Locomobile production ended in 1929.

Locomobile model specifications
 Locomobile Model 48 Sportif

Locomobiles in fiction

A Locomobile is the setting for one of the final scenes of F. Scott Fitzgerald's first novel, This Side of Paradise, in which the protagonist, Amory Blaine, argues for socialism to the father of a college friend, who staunchly defends the capitalist ideal.

In the spring and summer of 1946, a seven-passenger 1911 Locomobile touring car was driven from Boston to Los Angeles and back as a promotional tour for the Columbia Pictures film Gallant Journey. While not appearing in the movie, the Locomobile attracted much attention for the picture on the tour.

In Thomas Savage's 1967 novel The Power of the Dog, set in the 1920s, the Locomobile is esteemed by protagonist Peter Gordon as a peer to the Pierce-Arrow: "... Those were the vehicles of the high and mighty, and he knew that only the Locomobile (fancied by old General Pershing, among others) rivaled the Pierce."

Clive Cussler's 2007 novel, The Chase, as well as his 2010 novel The Spy, featured a 1906 Locomobile.

In Dashiell Hammett's 1925 mystery story "Scorched Face", the rich girls for whom the Continental Op is looking, were driving a Locomobile "with a special cabriolet body" when they disappeared.

Papa LaBas from Ishmael Reed's 1972 novel Mumbo Jumbo drives a Locomobile.

The Locomobile is central to the 2015 historical novel by Lisa Begin-Kruysman titled Around the World in 1909: Harriet White Fisher and Her Locomobile. The novel is based on Harriet White Fisher's circumnavigation of the globe; the Locomobile is driven, hauled, pushed, and floated in places where no man, let alone woman, had yet explored, certainly not on wheels.

See also

 List of defunct United States automobile manufacturers

References

Further reading
 Frank Leslie's Popular Monthly (January 1904)
 
 
 Ball, Donald L. The Genealogy of the Locomobile Steam Carriage, 1899–1904, 1994

External links

 Old 16 Locomobile (VanderbiltCupRaces.com)
 1906 Locomobile The story of the 1908 Vanderbilt Cup win
 Locomobile Catalog on DurantCars site 1920s Locomobiles
 Locomobile items on Henry Ford Museum site
 Locomobile Society Home Page
 Locomobile Advertising View the old locomobile ads
 1923 Locomobile Model 48 Sportif in the 'Hemmings' magazine

Brass Era vehicles
Vintage vehicles
Defunct motor vehicle manufacturers of the United States
Luxury motor vehicle manufacturers
Steam cars
Durant Motors
Companies based in Bridgeport, Connecticut
1899 establishments in Massachusetts
Vehicle manufacturing companies established in 1899
American companies established in 1899
1890s cars
1900s cars
1910s cars
1920s cars
Veteran vehicles
Vehicle manufacturing companies disestablished in 1929
Cars introduced in 1899
Motor vehicle manufacturers based in Connecticut